Darolelm is an Iranian newspaper in Fars Province. The concessionaire of this magazine was Enayatollah Dastgheib and it was published in Shiraz since 1909.

See also
List of magazines and newspapers of Fars

References

Newspapers published in Fars Province
Mass media in Fars Province
Newspapers published in Qajar Iran